KQRN (107.3 FM", Q107.3) is a radio station licensed in Mitchell, South Dakota, which serves the Mitchell, South Dakota Micropolitan Statistical Area, and Huron, South Dakota areas (which make up the Mitchell-Huron media market). The station is owned by Nancy and Steve Nedved, through licensee Nedved Media, LLC. It airs an adult hits and a Top 40 rock and pop music format.

The station was assigned the KQRN call letters by the Federal Communications Commission.

Ownership
In February 2008, Riverfront Broadcasting LLC of Yankton, South Dakota reached an agreement with NRG Media to purchase this station as part of a six station deal.

In late 2016, Riverfront Broadcasting LLC sold the station, along with sister stations KORN News Radio 1490, and KORN Country 92.1 to Nancy & Steve Nedved. Effective Sunday, January 1, 2017, the three station group is now known as Nedved Media, LLC.

References

External links
KQRN official website

QRN
Mass media in the Mitchell, South Dakota micropolitan area
Adult hits radio stations in the United States
Radio stations established in 1974